Caroline Märklin (1826–1893), was a German businessperson.

She was married in 1859 to the industrialist Theodor Friedrich Wilhelm Märklin (1817-1866), who founded the toy company Märklin.

She was the co-partner of her spouse in building up the company. She made business trips around Germany and Switzerland as the representative of the company, and has been referred to as the first female travel salesman. She was widowed in 1866, and made a major contribution in building up the company, which was recently founded, unto an international company. While she remarried in 1868, her second spouse was not interested in business and she continued to manage it alone. She retired in favor of her sons in 1888.

References 

1826 births
1893 deaths
19th-century German businesswomen
19th-century German businesspeople